Risto Pekka Miikkulainen (born 16 December 1961) is a Finnish-American computer scientist and professor at the University of Texas at Austin. In 2016, he was named Fellow of the Institute of Electrical and Electronics Engineers (IEEE) "for contributions to techniques and applications for neural and evolutionary computation". Born in Helsinki, Finland, Miikkulainen is a U.S. citizen and has lived in the United States since 1990.

References 

Fellow Members of the IEEE
Living people
1961 births
University of California, Los Angeles alumni
American computer scientists
Finnish computer scientists
Finnish expatriates in the United States
Naturalized citizens of the United States
Scientists from Helsinki